Sven Olof Johnson (12 September 1899 – 7 July 1986) was a Swedish gymnast, who competed in the 1920 Summer Olympics. He was part of the Swedish team that won the all-around Swedish system event.

References

1899 births
1986 deaths
Swedish male artistic gymnasts
Gymnasts at the 1920 Summer Olympics
Olympic gymnasts of Sweden
Olympic gold medalists for Sweden
Olympic medalists in gymnastics
Medalists at the 1920 Summer Olympics
Sportspeople from Norrköping